The MaliVai Washington Kids Foundation is a United States foundation created in 1994 by former professional tennis player MaliVai Washington to model achievement and life skills to children through playing tennis. Centered in Jacksonville, Florida, the organization also provides tutoring and mentoring to its youth audience.

In the mid-2000s, the foundation broke ground on a  Youth Tennis and Education Complex in Durkeeville that was expected to double the number of youth participants, previously about 1,000 per year.

References

External links
MaliVai Washington Kids Foundation website

Non-profit organizations based in Jacksonville, Florida
Child-related organizations in the United States
Sports foundations based in the United States
Organizations established in 1994